The IEEE Emanuel R. Piore Award was a Technical Field Award given each year by the IEEE to an individual or team of two people who have made outstanding contributions to information processing systems in relation to computer science. The award was discontinued in 2012.

The award was established in 1976 and named in honor of Emanuel R. Piori. It could be presented to an individual or a team of two. Recipients of this award received a bronze medal, certificate, and honorarium.

Recipients 
The following people received the IEEE Emanuel R. Piore Award:

References

External links 
 IEEE Emanuel R. Piore Award page at IEEE
 List of recipients of the IEEE Emanuel R. Piore Award

Emanuel R. Piore Award